Canadian Veterinary Journal is a monthly peer-reviewed scientific journal covering new scientific developments in veterinary medicine. It was established in 1960 and is the official journal of the Canadian Veterinary Medical Association.

According to the Journal Citation Reports, its 2020 impact factor is 1.008, ranking it 98 out of 146 journals in the category 'Veterinary Sciences'.

References

External links 
 

English-language journals
Veterinary medicine journals
Academic journals associated with learned and professional societies